"Can't Let Go" is a single by R&B/funk band Earth, Wind & Fire released in 1979 on ARC/Columbia Records. The song peaked at No. 12 on the  Blues & Soul Top British Soul Singles chart, No. 31 on the Dutch Pop Singles chart and No. 46 on the UK Pop Singles chart.

Overview
"Can't Let Go" was produced by Maurice White and composed by Bill Meyers, Maurice White and Allee Willis. The song was released on the 1979 studio album I Am.

The single's B-side was a song called "Love Music" which was released on the 1978 compilation album The Best of Earth, Wind & Fire, Vol. 1.

Chart positions

References

1979 songs
1979 singles
Earth, Wind & Fire songs
Columbia Records singles
Songs written by Allee Willis
Songs written by Maurice White